Nova Drenčina is a village in Croatia. It is located between Petrinja and Sisak.

References

Populated places in Sisak-Moslavina County